Abraham Moshe Brener (Rabino Moises Brener) (died January 5, 1968) was the former Chief Rabbi (Gran Rabino) of Lima, Peru. He served as the Chief Rabbi of Lima from the mid 1930s to 1962. Following his tenure, Rabbi Brener moved to New York City.

Peru
In 1935, Rabbi Brener, arrived in Lima. Initially he was not officially hired by the community, but he was an experienced mohel and shochet, as well as cantor, so he quickly took over as Rabbi. Together with the completion of the construction of its own synagogue (La Unión Israelita) in 1934, the community became an organized and official institution. Between the 1950s and 1960s, members of La Unión Israelita created three other synagogues: Malvas, Adat Israel, and Sharón. Rabbi Brener traveled to different provinces to circumcise babies, and others were circumcised at his home when they were older. Rabbi Brener served in Lima for 30 years until 1962. He retired and moved to New York, where he passed away a few years later. He was buried in Jerusalem, Israel.

Family
Abraham Moshe Brener is the father of Rabbi Pynchas Brener, the former Chief Rabbi of Venezuela and current ambassador of Venezuela to Israel (as appointed by Juan Guaido). Abraham Moshe Brener died in New York on January 5, 1968 (4 Tevet 5728) and is buried in Israel.

References

Year of birth missing
1968 deaths
Rabbis in South America
20th-century Polish rabbis
Polish emigrants
Immigrants to Peru
Polish emigrants to the United States